Voice of the Whirlwind is a 1987 cyberpunk science fiction novel by American writer Walter Jon Williams.

Plot introduction

Etienne Steward is a clone, also known as a beta. When he awakes, his memories are fifteen years old, because the original Steward—the alpha—never bothered to have his memories updated.

In those fifteen years, the entire world has changed. An alien race known as The Powers has established relations with humanity. The Orbital Policorp, which held his allegiance, has collapsed. He fought and survived the off-world Artifacts War, but dozens of his friends did not. Both his first and second wives have divorced him. Further, someone has murdered him, causing the activation of the beta back-up. Now Steward has to figure out who wanted him dead, if he does not want to die again.

Series
Voice of the Whirlwind is part of a series which includes:
Hardwired (1986) 
Solip:System (1989)

and can be interpreted as a prequel to 
''Aristoi (1992)

1987 American novels
1987 science fiction novels
American science fiction novels
Cyberpunk novels